Dan Fosse (February 26, 1918 – December 6, 1987) was a Norwegian actor. He is best known for his role as the housemaster Haukås in the Stompa films and as the voice of Bodø in the radio plays about Stompa & Co.

Family
Dan Fosse was the father of the teacher Dan Harald Fosse and the makeup artist Veslemøy Fosse Ree.

Career
Fosse performed at the Edderkoppen Theater in 1962 and 1963 in the productions Skikk og bruk and Julebokken 1961. He also performed as an actor at the National Theater in 1968 and 1969 and participated in productions of The Memorandum (Norwegian title: Sirkulæret) and Rosencrantz and Guildenstern Are Dead (Norwegian title: Rosenkrantz og Gyldenstern er døde).

Fosse was a language phenomenon ahead of some in Norwegian revue because he mastered many different dialects, which served him well in the interpretation of his many role types. He is also known from five films about the Olsen Gang, in which he played a guard and a butler.

Radio was also an important medium for Fosse. In addition to the Stompa radio plays, which were a great success in the Saturday children's program, he also contributed to many NRK Radio Theater plays in the 1970s. Some of his best-known contributions can be found in the series Dickie Dick Dickens and God aften, mitt navn er Cox.

Filmography

1949: Svendsen går videre
1953: Skøytekongen
1956: Bjørnepatruljen
1956: Gylne ungdom as Olaf Vestby, a shopowner
1956: Kvinnens plass as the man that saw a UFO
1957: Peter van Heeren
1957: Selv om de er små
1957: Smuglere i smoking
1958: På tokt med Terna
1960: Veien tilbake
1962: Stompa & Co as Haukås the housemaster
1963: Stompa, selvfølgelig! as Haukås the housemaster
1964: Alle tiders kupp as the clerk at the alcoholic beverage retailer
1964: Husmorfilmen høsten 1964
1964: Pappa tar gull as Nille
1965: To på topp as the galley boy
1966: Kontorsjef Tangen
1967: Min kones ferie as the reindeer driver
1968: Skipper Worse
1969: An-Magritt as Gørr-Ola
1969: 22. november – den store leiegården as the ticket seller
1970: Balladen om mestertyven Ole Høiland as Emanuel
1970: Olsenbanden og Dynamitt-Harry as the guard at the state bank
1974: Under en steinhimmel as Emanuel
1975: Olsenbandens siste bedrifter as the guard with a dog
1976: Olsenbanden for full musikk as Joachim
1977: Olsenbanden og Dynamitt-Harry på sporet as the guard with a dog
1978: Olsenbanden og Data-Harry sprenger verdensbanken as the traffic warden
1981: Fleksnes fataliteter as the man in the national library archives

References

External links
 
 Dan Fosse at the Swedish Film Database
 Dan Fosse at Filmfront
 Dan Fosse at Sceneweb

1918 births
1987 deaths
20th-century Norwegian actors
People from Meland